The 1975 AFC Youth Championship was held in Kuwait.

Teams
The following teams entered the tournament:

 
 
 
 
 
 
 
 
 
 
 
 
  (host)
 
 
 
 
 
 

Note: Sri Lanka withdrew before the draw.

Group stage

Group A

Group B

Group C

Group D

Quarterfinals

Semifinals

Third place match

Final

External links
Results by RSSSF

AFC U-19 Championship
1974–75 in Kuwaiti football
1975 in Asian football
International association football competitions hosted by Kuwait
1975 in youth association football